Grotelüschen is a German surname. Notable people with the surname include:

 Astrid Grotelüschen (born 1964), German politician
 Simon Grotelüschen (born 1986), German sailor

German-language surnames